Derin Seale is an Australian filmmaker, best known for his film, The Eleven O'Clock for which he received an Academy Award for Best Live Action Short Film nomination at the 90th Academy Awards.

Filmography
 2016: The Eleven O'Clock (Short, director, producer) 
 2003: Cold Mountain (second unit director - as Derin A. Seale) 
 2000: Tulip (Short, editor) 
 1999: The Talented Mr. Ripley (thanks) 
 1998: Static (Short) (writer) 
 1996: The English Patient (video playback operator) 
 1989: Dead Poets Society (thanks) 
 1987: Sons and Daughters (TV Series, actor)

References

External links
 

Living people
Australian producers
Australian directors
Australian screenwriters
Year of birth missing (living people)